Jimi Hendrix (1942–1970) was an American guitarist and singer-songwriter whose career spanned from 1962 to 1970. He appeared in several commercially released films of concerts and documentaries about his career, including two popular 1960s music festival films – Monterey Pop (1968) and Woodstock (1970). A short documentary, Experience (1968), also known as See My Music Talking, was also screened.

At the time of his death, two concert films were in development.  Jimi Plays Berkeley (1971) was the first film featuring Hendrix to be issued posthumously.  A second, tentatively titled The Last Experience, was filmed of the Jimi Hendrix Experience's last British concert.  However, legal difficulties have prevented its release.  Additionally, a theatrical film, with incidental music and 17 minutes of Hendrix's performing, was released as Rainbow Bridge (1971).  In 1973, the first attempt at a biographical documentary film, titled Jimi Hendrix was released.

Over the years, many concert films and documentaries have been forthcoming.  In addition to full-length performances at Monterey and Woodstock, Hendrix's 1970 concerts at the Isle of Wight and the Atlanta International Pop Festivals have been released on video.  DVD releases of several of these and the earlier films have been certified as "Gold" and "Platinum" in several countries. The 2013 documentary Hear My Train A Comin' received an Emmy Award in 2014.

Concert films

Documentaries

Music performances in other films

See also
Jimi Hendrix discography
Jimi Hendrix posthumous discography
List of songs recorded by Jimi Hendrix

Notes
Citations

References

Videographies of American artists
Videography
Discographies of American artists
Rock music discographies